Carlos Alberto da Luz (1 May 1945 – 4 April 2019) was a Brazilian football manager.

References

1945 births
2019 deaths
Brazilian football managers
Sportspeople from Espírito Santo
Expatriate football managers in Panama
Brazilian expatriate football managers
Brazilian expatriate sportspeople in Panama